Rendlesham Forest  is a  mixed woodland in Suffolk owned by Forestry England with recreation facilities for walkers, cyclists and campers.

Geography
The forest is in the parishes of Bromeswell in the west, Eyke, Capel St Andrew to the south, and Butley, Suffolk to the east. It is in the Suffolk Coastal district. It is part of the Sandlings Forest Site of Special Scientific Interest.  A large area of the forest was cleared for the construction of RAF Woodbridge in 1943.

See also
 Rendlesham Forest incident

References

External links
Forestry England Website for Rendlesham Forest

Forests and woodlands of Suffolk
Suffolk Coastal
Tourist attractions in Suffolk